Khairullah Anosh was the former Governor of Samangan Province, Afghanistan. He is the former district governor of Andkhoy District of Faryab Province. 
 
Anosh is a member of the National Islamic Movement of Afghanistan (Junbish-e Milli-yi Islami-yi Afghanistan).

References

Living people
National Islamic Movement of Afghanistan politicians
Afghan Uzbek politicians
Year of birth missing (living people)